Phillip David Wyman  (February 21, 1945 – November 28, 2019) was an American politician from California. A Republican, he was a member of the California State Assembly from 1978 to 1992 and again from 2000 to 2002; he was also a member of the California Senate from 1993 to 1994.

Assembly races

Wyman was vice president of the Antelope Valley Board of Trade in 1976 when he first ran for California State Assembly from the Tehachapi-Palmdale based 34th District.  He narrowly lost to Democratic incumbent Larry Chimbole but went on to defeat him two 
years later and served in the Assembly from 1978 until 1992, when he opted not to seek reelection and instead run for congress.

In 2000 Wyman ran again for Assembly in the 34th Assembly District, which consisted of the Mojave Desert portion of San Bernardino County (except for the Morongo valley), the eastern Kern County desert/mountains area and Inyo County. He defeated the city manager of Victorville to win the Republican nomination, and then easily won the November 2000 general election in a heavily Republican district.

In 2002, redistricting after the 2000 Census prompted Wyman to run in the new 36th Assembly District. He moved to a small apartment in Phelan, California (in the rural San Bernardino County desert) to qualify to run, which caused his political opponents to accuse him of being a carpetbagger. He narrowly lost the Republican primary to Sharon Runner of Lancaster, the wife of then-incumbent Assemblyman George Runner.

In 2006, he ran again for Assembly in the 36th Assembly District, based in Kern County, but lost the Republican primary to Bakersfield Superintendent of Schools Jean Fuller.

Congressional race

The 25th Congressional district was created after the 1991 reapportionment and was centered on the new city of Santa Clarita in fast growing northern Los Angeles County. Wyman moved south from Tehachapi in Kern County to run for the new 25th. He narrowly lost the GOP primary to Santa Clarita Mayor Buck McKeon, however.

State Senate races

Wyman bounced back less than a year later when he won a special election for the Fresno-based 16th state Senate district in 1993.

In 1994, despite huge Republican gains across the country, Wyman lost his state Senate seat to then Democratic Assemblyman Jim Costa (whom Wyman had defeated in the special election).  He was the only Republican west of the Mississippi to be unseated.   In 1996 he ran for a neighboring state Senate seat and lost the GOP primary again, this time to Palmdale area Assemblyman Pete Knight.

In 2010 he ran once more for the state Senate seat he had lost to Costa in 1994. He narrowly lost the primary to Tim Theissen, who then lost the general election to Democrat Michael J. Rubio.

Reputation

Through the years Wyman gained a reputation for moving around the area in order to run for office.  He originally served as an Assemblyman from Tehachapi (in Kern County), moved south to run for congress in Los Angeles County in 1992, then won election to a state Senate seat in 1993 in Fresno County (north of Kern county) before losing a state Senate primary in 1996 in Los Angeles county again.

Return

In 2000 Wyman made a comeback of sorts, winning his old 34th Assembly district.  Two years later, however, he made a tactical error and decided to run for reelection in the neighboring 36th district instead.  He was anticipating an opening in the state Senate in 2004, a district that was outside the boundaries of his 34th Assembly district, but within those of the 36th.  His plans went awry when the 36th's incumbent, fellow Republican George Runner decided to back his wife (Sharon Runner), who actually lived within the district.  Wyman narrowly lost the GOP primary, while his old 34th district was won by Republican Bill Maze, a Tulare County supervisor, who found himself unopposed after Wyman decided not to run here.

In 2014 Wyman was an unsuccessful candidate for California Attorney General, losing the GOP spot to former deputy state Attorney General Ronald Gold by just 1.2%.

In 2016, Wyman declared his candidacy in the race for the Senate seat from California being vacated by Democrat Barbara Boxer. In the June 7 primary, Wyman came in fourth in the overall field, with 247,397 total votes (4.9%), and thus was the second highest-performing Republican in the field, only behind George "Duf" Sundheim's 409,096 (8%).

Death 
Wyman died from cancer in Tehachapi on November 28, 2019, aged 74.

Electoral history

References

External links
JoinCalifornia, Election History for the State of California

|-

|-

1945 births
2019 deaths
20th-century American politicians
21st-century American politicians
Republican Party California state senators
Candidates in the 1992 United States elections
Candidates in the 1994 United States elections
Candidates in the 1996 United States elections
Candidates in the 2010 United States elections
Candidates in the 2016 United States Senate elections
Deaths from cancer in California
Republican Party members of the California State Assembly
People from Hollywood, Los Angeles
People from Kern County, California
Politicians from Los Angeles
University of California, Davis alumni